Stanslaus Haroon Nyongo (born September 1, 1973) is a Tanzanian politician and a member of the Chama Cha Mapinduzi political party. He was elected MP representing Maswa District since 2015 and was a Deputy Minister of Minerals until December 2020.

References 

1973 births
Living people
Chama Cha Mapinduzi MPs
Chama Cha Mapinduzi politicians
Tanzanian MPs 2015–2020
Tanzanian MPs 2020–2025
Deputy government ministers of Tanzania